Yefimiya Petrovna Krivosheyeva (1 June 186724 June 1936) was an Erzya writer and folk storyteller.

References 

Soviet writers
Erzyan-language writers
Storytellers
1936 deaths
1867 births